A ski season is a period when skiing, snowboarding and other alpine sports are viable in an alpine resort. The season corresponds to when ski lifts are running and lift passes are available. Depending on the latitude and altitude of the resort, the season will typically run from early to mid-winter until mid- to late spring. Ideally the season will be over before the thaw begins.

A typical ski season has three stages, and therefore three levels of lift ticket pricing:

 Off-peak, at the very beginning and ending of the season, when the number of lifts open is limited and the snow cover in the lower sections of the mountain is typically patchy.
 Shoulder, during which the mountain is entirely snow-covered but lift pass sales are not sufficiently lucrative to justify opening all lifts or areas of the mountain.
 Peak, during which all lifts and most if not all runs are open. These periods are usually at the height of the season or during school or public holidays.

Typically in the United States, a ski season lasts from late November to early April, however larger resorts in Colorado and California are known to spin the lifts as late as the 4th of July.

The introduction of artificial snowmaking with snow guns in the late 1950s revolutionized the ski industry drastically changing the ski season for every climate. With snowmakers becoming popular for large ski resorts to invest in the 1960s we began to see more and more smaller resorts open up with the ability to maintain snow in places where snow didn't naturally occur very often. By the start of the 1970s snowmaking Technology had progressed far enough to see ski resorts open all across the east coast mountains and Midwest in places that can regularly see less than 3 feet of natural snowfall a year. Today we can see ski resorts rely on artificial snow making even more as climate change shortens the window for natural snowfall.

Some ski resorts like the small mountain resort of Cataloochee found in western North Carolina almost entirely relay on artificial snowmaking to stay open. With an average yearly snowfall total of only around 35 inches (most of which occur in January and February) Cataloochee is still able to open up around November 20 and maintain snow till March 25. Even in bad snow years thanks to heavy investments in snowmaking technology Cataloochee can open with no natural snowfall and will often but open for months before the first real snowstorm occurs. With a base elevation of 4,660 and a peak of 5,400 it is the second highest ski resort on the entire east coast second only to its neighbor 2 hours to the north beech mountain. Both of which are in the high southern Appalachian smokey mountain range. It is because of these high elevations that they are able to operate with the valleys around the resorts seeing much less if any snowfall.

The snow season can change drastically from year to year and mountain to mountain. One of the most well-known mountains in the US to keep snow on their trails and lifts spinning is the timberline lodge resort at the base of mount hood. With a base elevation at 4,540 and a peak elevation of 8,540 it is not the highest elevation ski resort on western United States. Its unique climate can bring an average of 400 inches of wet heavy snow also known as cascades concrete. The wet heavy snow takes a lot longer to melt than dry fluffy snow that the central Rocky Mountains are known for.

References 

Seasons
Season